355 (died after 1780) was the code name of a female spy during the American Revolution, part of the Culper Ring. She was one of the first spies for the United States, but her real identity is unknown. The number 355 could be decrypted from the system the Culper Ring used to mean "lady."

Biography
The only direct reference to 355 in any of the Culper Ring's missives (1778–1780) appears in a letter from Abraham Woodhull ("Samuel Culper Sr.") to General George Washington, where Woodhull describes her as "one who hath been ever serviceable to this correspondence."

The true identity of 355 remains unknown, but some facts about her seem clear. She worked with the American Patriots during the Revolutionary War as a spy, and was likely recruited by Woodhull into the spy ring. The way the code is constructed indicates that she may have had "some degree of social prominence." She was likely living in New York City at the time, and at some point had contact with Major John André and Benedict Arnold. One person who has been named as the possible identity of Agent 355 was Anna Strong, Woodhull's neighbor. Strong allegedly helped the Culper Ring by signaling to its members the location of Caleb Brewster, who raided British shipments in his whaleboat around Long Island Sound after he was given a secure location by Strong.

Another theory is that 355 may have been Robert Townsend's common-law wife. Stories about Townsend state that he was in love with 355. John Burke and Andrea Meyer have made a different case for 355's involvement in the spy ring, using circumstantial evidence that she may have been close to Major John André and also to Benjamin Tallmadge, thereby protecting Woodhull from accusations of being a spy. Other possible candidates for 355 include Sarah Horton Townsend and Elizabeth Burgin.

It is also occasionally believed that there was no Agent 355 at all, but rather that the code indicated a woman who had useful information but was not "formally connected to the ring." The code itself may have referred to "a woman," not an agent who was a woman.

355 is thought to have played a major role in exposing Arnold as a defector and in the arrest of André, who was hanged in Tappan, New York. She may have been a member of a prominent Loyalist family, which would have put her within easy reach of British commanders.

The then pregnant 355 was arrested in 1780 when Benedict Arnold defected to the Loyalists. However, Alexander Rose disagrees with this narrative, stating that "females were not kept aboard prison ships," and that "there's no record whatsoever of a birth." Strengthening the idea that Agent 355 may have been Anna Strong is the fact that Anna's husband, Selah Strong, was imprisoned on Jersey and she was supposedly allowed to bring him food. Her presence on the ship may have led to the legend that Agent 355 was herself imprisoned there.

In popular culture

Agent 355 has become a part of popular fiction.

One of the main characters in Y: The Last Man from Vertigo Comics is a modern spy that goes by Agent 355. She is part of a fictionalized Culper Ring that has remained active into modern times.
Idara Victor plays fictional Agent 355 in the television series Turn: Washington's Spies.  In the show, Agent 355 is the code name of a former slave named Abigail.  She had been owned by Anna Strong until the British army seized Selah's property upon his imprisonment. Though technically free, she is coerced into working for John André. Abigail collects information overheard in André's home and hides it in gifts sent to her son, left in Anna's care.
In Season 4, Episode 6 (Identity Crisis) of the US TV show White Collar, the show's main characters investigate a Culper conspiracy theory based on letters owned by a descendant of 355.
Rebel Spy by Veronica Rossi, a young adult novel reimagining the story behind Agent 355, was published in 2020.
The 355 is a female-led spy film released by Universal Pictures on January 7, 2022.  A group of women from different international spy agencies create a faction code-named 355 in honor of Agent 355.

See also
Intelligence in the American Revolutionary War

Footnotes

Citations

Sources 
 
 
 

1780s deaths
Female wartime spies
Women in the American Revolution
Year of birth unknown
Unidentified people
American spies during the American Revolution